Kerri Colby is the stage name of Elyse Alessandra Anderson, an American drag performer most known for competing on season 14 of RuPaul's Drag Race, where she would place ninth overall. Kerri Colby is based in Los Angeles, California, and she is the drag daughter of well-known drag artist Sasha Colby.

Early life
Anderson was born in Dallas, Texas. She was raised in a Pentecostal household. She stated that she has never fit in with those beliefs, and after watching the fifth season of RuPaul's Drag Race, she learned about drag. She left home at 15, and she has stated the reasoning for leaving is the toxic environment that her family created for her. She couch-surfed and found friends to take care of her after leaving home. She has stated that many of the people taking care of her were much older, and it led to abusive situations.

One day when Kerri was resting at a train station, a stranger recognized her from her posts on both Instagram and online and offered to help. Kerri told them that unless they helped with her homelessness, they could not help. This person then took Kerri in until she was eighteen. Kerri has stated in an interview, "[My friend was] completely my angel... I would not have made it."

Career
She competed on season 14 of RuPaul's Drag Race. On episode 4, she landed in the bottom and lip-synced against Alyssa Hunter to Jennifer Lopez's song, "Play". On episode 8, she landed in the bottom again with Jasmine Kennedie, and lost the lip-sync to "Un-Break My Heart" by Toni Braxton.

She was a featured performer during Jennifer Lopez's performance at the 2022 iHeartRadio Music Awards. In May, her nomination was announced at the 2022 WOWIE Awards as part of RuPaul's DragCon in Los Angeles in the category Best Viral Moment (The America's Next Top Meme Award), shared with drag queens Daya Betty and Kornbread "The Snack" Jeté.

In 2022, Colby appeared in an advertising campaign for cannabis beverage brand Cann, alongside fellow season 14 contestants Willow Pill, Jorgeous, and Kornbread, as well as other LGBTQ+ celebrities including Hayley Kiyoko and Gus Kenworthy. During press for the Cann campaign, Colby shared that she worked at a dispensary before appearing on Drag Race.

Personal life 
Kerri Colby is a trans woman and is noted for guiding fellow Drag Race contestant Kornbread Jeté with her transition as well. She has also helped inspire Jasmine Kennedie to come out as a trans woman on an episode of Untucked on season 14 of RuPaul's Drag Race. Bosco has also cited Kerri Colby as a source of "clarity" in her transition, which she announced after season 14 wrapped filming.

Awards and nominations

References

External links
 

1996 births
Living people
African-American drag queens
American drag queens
LGBT people from Texas
People from Dallas
People from Los Angeles
Kerri Colby
Transgender women
Transgender drag performers